or  is a lake that lies in the municipality of Sørfold in Nordland county, Norway. Nedre Veikvatnet has an inlet from the nearby lake Øvre Veikvatnet, and an outlet that connects to another nearby lake Kobbvatnet.

See also
 List of lakes in Norway
 Geography of Norway

References

Sørfold
Lakes of Nordland